Easley Rutland Blackwood (June 25, 1903 – March 27, 1992) was an American contract bridge player and writer, best known for the Blackwood convention used in bridge bidding.

Biography
Blackwood was born in Birmingham, Alabama, but lived most of his life in Indianapolis, Indiana.  From 1968 to 1971 he was executive secretary of the American Contract Bridge League (ACBL). He was inducted into the ACBL Hall of Fame in 1995.

His son is Easley Blackwood Jr., a noted musician.

Publications

Books
 Bridge Humanics: How to Play People as well as the Cards (Indianapolis: Droke House, 1949); UK title, 1951, The Human Element in Bridge [same subtitle]
 Blackwood on Bidding: Dynamic Point Count (Bobbs-Merrill, 1956)
 Blackwood on Slams (Prentice-Hall, 1970); later title, Bidding Slams with Blackwood
 Spite & Malice: The Complete Rules and Strategy (Cornerstone Library, 1970)
 Contract Bridge Complete by Ernest W. Rovere (Simon & Schuster Fireside Books, 1975) – contributor
 How You Can Play Winning Bridge, with Blackwood (Los Angeles: Pinnacle Books, 1977)
 Play of the Hand with Blackwood (Los Angeles: Corwin Books, 1978)
 Winning Bridge with Blackwood, Blackwood and Derek Rimington (London: Robert Hale, 1983) – revised, British edition of How You Can Play ..., 1977 
 The Complete Book of Opening Leads (Devyn, 1983)
 Card Play Fundamentals, Blackwood and Keith Hanson (Devyn, 1987)

Pamphlets
 The Blackwood Convention (Louisville, KY: Devyn Press, 1981) – Championship bridge series, no. 2
 Introduction to Declarer Play (Devyn, 1989) – Future champions' bridge series, no. 8

Bridge accomplishments

Awards and honors 

 International Bridge Press Association Personality of the Year, 1984
 ACBL Hall of Fame, 1995

See also
List of contract bridge people

References

External links
 
 
  on Championship Bridge with Charles Goren,  1959–1964 (audio-video)
  

 WARNING: WorldCat includes works by the musician Easley Blackwood Jr.

1903 births
1992 deaths
American contract bridge players
Contract bridge writers
Writers from Birmingham, Alabama
Writers from Indianapolis
Place of death missing